Kanda Naal Mudhal (கண்ட நாள் முதல்) is a 2022 Indian-Tamil-language Family drama television series, starring Naveen, Dharshana Ashokan, Rashmitha and Arun Rajan in main roles. It premiered on Colors Tamil on 13 June 2022, and airs on Monday to Friday at 20:30 and available for streaming in selected markets on Voot. That deals with is a police constable, who gets forcefully married to a modern IT girl who resides in the same apartment.

Cast

Main
 Naveen Kumar - Kumaran: a police constable, Archana's Younger brother and Nandini`s Husband.
 Dharshana Ashokan - Nandhini: a modern IT girl, Nagulan's Younger sister and Kumaran`s Wife.
 Rashmitha - Archana: she is very hardworking women, Kumaran's Elder sister and Nakulan`s Wife.
 Arun Rajan - Nakulan: Nandini's` Elder brother and Archana's Husband.

Supporting
 Meena Kumari - Lakshmi: Nakulan, Nandini's Mother and Sivamani` Wife.
 Rishikeshav - Sivamani: Nakulan, Nandini's Father and Lakshmi`s Husband.
 Kiran Mai - Then
 Anuradha - Thaai Kezhavi: Sivamani`s Mother

Special appearances
 Ajay Rathnam - IG Ravi
 Sanjeev Venkat - Pulikutty

Production

Casting
Neethane Enthan Ponvasantham fame Dharshana will be playing the lead role alongside with Idhayathai Thirudathe fame Navin Kumar. Meena Kumari and Rishikeshav are working together after 2017-2011 TV series Magal. Rashmitha was selected to play the role of Archana and Arun Rajan was selected to play the role of Nagulan. Arun Rajan last appeared in Sun TV series Magal in 2020-2022. Sanjeev Venkat and Anuradha joined the cast in August 2022.

References

Colors Tamil original programming
Tamil-language romance television series
Tamil-language police television series
2022 Tamil-language television series debuts
Tamil-language television shows
Television shows set in Tamil Nadu